James, Jim, Jimmy or Jamie Thompson may refer to:

Arts and sciences
 James Thompson (cartographer) (active 1785), who produced one of the first maps of York
 James Thompson (surveyor) (1789–1872), who produced the first plat of Chicago
 James Thompson (journalist) (1817–1877), journalist and local historian
 James Maurice Thompson (1844–1901), American novelist
 Uncle Jimmy Thompson (1848–1931), country music pioneer
 James Westfall Thompson (1869–1941), American historian
 James Matthew Thompson (1878–1956), English historian and theologian
 Jim Thompson (writer) (1906–1977), American author and screenwriter, known for his pulp crime fiction
 Jimmy Thompson (comics artist) (1907–1949), Canadian artist in the Golden Age of Comics
 James D. Thompson (1920–1973), American sociologist, author of Organizations in Action
 Jimmy Thompson (actor) (1925–2005), British actor
 Jimmy Thompson, American film actor known for roles in Singin' in the Rain and Brigadoon
 James R. Thompson Jr. (1936–2017), known as J.R. Thompson, former director of NASA's Marshall Space Flight Center, 1986–1989
 James R. Thompson (statistician) (1938–2017), American statistician
 James Thompson (crime writer) (1964–2014), American-Finnish crime writer
 James Thompson (designer) (born 1966), Northern Irish inventor and patent holder in the airline seating industry
 Jamie Thompson, Canadian musician

Business
 James Pyke Thompson (1846–1897), English corn merchant and philanthropist
 James Walter Thompson (1847–1928), American advertiser and namesake of the JWT advertising agency
 Jim Thompson (designer) (1906–disappeared 1967), revived the Thai silk industry
 James E. Thompson (born 1940), founder, chairman and chief executive of The Crown Worldwide Group

Military
 James Thompson (VC) (1830–1891), recipient of the Victoria Cross
 James Thompson of brothers Allen and James Thompson (1849–1921), American Civil War soldier and Medal of Honor recipient
 Floyd James Thompson (1933–2002), America's longest-held POW; spent almost 9 years in POW camps in Vietnam
 James B. Thompson (1843–1875), American soldier who fought in the American Civil War
 James E. Thompson Jr. (1935–2017), U.S. Army general
 James H. Thompson, American soldier, surgeon and recipient of the Medal of Honor

Politics
 James Thompson (jurist) (1806–1874), congressman and Chief Justice of the Supreme Court of Pennsylvania
 James Thompson (Kansas politician), congressional candidate in Kansas in 2018
 James Thompson (Australian politician), member of the New South Wales Legislative Assembly, 1856–1857
 James Banford Thompson (1832–1901), member of the New South Wales Legislative Assembly, 1877–1881
 James G. Thompson (New York politician) (1829–?), New York politician
 James Thompson (civil servant) (1848–1929), Acting Governor of Madras
 James T. Thompson (1849–1921), mayor of Birkenhead, England, c. 1899
 James A. Thompson (New York politician) (c. 1873–1923), New York state senator
 James Frederick Thompson (1884–1966), member of the New Zealand Legislative Council
 James R. Thompson (1936-2020), known as Jim Thompson, governor of Illinois and member of the 9/11 Commission
 James A. Thompson (Texas politician), mayor of Sugar Land, Texas
 James Harold Thompson (born 1944), American politician in Florida
 Jim Thompson (Oregon politician), member of the Oregon House of Representatives
 James E. W. Thompson (1879–1958), Canadian politician in the Legislative Assembly of British Columbia

Religion
 James Thompson (martyr) (died 1582), Catholic priest hanged under Elizabeth I
 James Denton Thompson (1856–1924), Bishop of Sodor and Man
 Jim Thompson (bishop) (1936–2003), Anglican bishop of Stepney and Bath and Wells

Sports and games

Association football
 James Thompson (footballer) (1898–1984), English footballer, manager and scout
 Jimmy Thompson (footballer, born 1899) (1899–1961), English footballer
 Jimmy Thompson (footballer, born 1935), English footballer
 Jimmy Thompson (footballer, born 1943), English footballer (Grimsby Town)

Rugby
 Jimmy Thompson (rugby league) (born 1948), British rugby league footballer
 Jim Thompson (rugby union) (born 1984), Scottish rugby union player
 James Thompson (rugby union) (born 1999), New Zealand rugby union player

Water sports
 James Thompson (swimmer) (1906–1966), Canadian swimmer at the 1928 Olympics
 James Thompson (rower) (born 1986), South African rower
 Jim Thompson (powerboat racing) (1926–2021), manager of three-time Harmsworth Trophy winner Miss Supertest III
 Jim Thompson (designer) (1906–disappeared 1967), American businessman and Olympic sailor

Other sports and games
 James Thompson (chess player) (1804–1870), American chess master
 James Thompson (cricketer) (born 1961), Nevisian cricketer
 James Thompson (racing driver) (born 1974), English racing driver
 James Thompson (fighter) (born 1978), professional mixed martial arts fighter from Britain
 James Thompson (table tennis) (1889–?), English table tennis player
 J. B. Thompson (James Bogne Thompson, 1829–1877), co-creator of the laws of Australian rules football
 Jim Thompson (coach) (born 1949), founder and executive director of Positive Coaching Alliance and author
 James Thompson (judoka), American judoka
 Sandy Thompson (James Thompson, 1901–?), American baseball player

Other
 James Thompson (Rector of Lincoln College, Oxford)
 Jimmy Thompson (executioner) (1895–1950), Mississippi executioner active from 1940 to 1950
 James Richard "Ricky" Thompson Jr., perpetrator of the murders of John Goosey and Stacy Barnett (West Campus murders)

See also
 James Thomson (disambiguation)